Jeong Kkeutbyeol (born 1964) is a South Korean poet, literary critic, and professor. She studied Korean literature at Ewha Womans University and graduated with a Master's degree. Along with numerous volumes of poetry, Jeong has published several collections of critical essays, including The Poetics of Parody (1997) and The Language of Poetry Has a Thousand Tongues (1999).

Life
Jeong Kkeutbyeol was born in Naju, South Jeolla Province, South Korea in 1964. In 1983 she graduated from Myeongji Girls’ High School and enrolled in Ewha Womans University, graduating with a degree in Korean Language and Literature in 1987, then going on to earn her Master's and Doctorate degrees from the same university in 1989 and 1994, respectively.

Since 2002 Jeong Kkeutbyeol has variously served as a researcher at the Society of Ewha Korean Language and Literature, an adjunct professor in the Creative Writing department of Chugye University for the Arts, an honorary professor at the Korean Language and Literature department at her alma mater, and an assistant professor in the Practical Language and Literature department of Open Cyber University. In 2004 she was awarded the Yushim Award by the Society for the Promotion and Practice of Manhae's Thoughts. She won the Sowol Poetry Prize in 2008 for her poem "Vast Sleep".

In 2014 Jeong was appointed as a professor of Korean language and literature at both Ewha Womans University and Myongji University, where she currently works. She also participated in the 2015 East Asia Literature Forum.

Writing
Jeong Kkeutbyeol's literary debut was in 1988, when her poem "Sea of Calais" was selected for publication in the literary journal Monthly Literature and Thought. A year later, in 1989, her critical essay "A Cold Parodist's Despair and Inquiry" won The Dong-a Ilbo New Writer's Contest.

Her first collection of poetry, My Life, a Birch Tree (1996) was highly regarded by critics and fellow writers alike. Jeong's other poetry collections include White Book (2000), 180 Thousand Years and the Color Peach (2005), Bursting (2008), and Subject Markers, Topic Markers (2014). She has also published several collections of critical and literary essays, most notably The Poetics of Parody (1997), which systematically discusses theories on parody, analyzing them in the context of contemporary Korean poetry. Another of her essay collections, The Language of Poetry Has a Thousand Tongues (1999), provides an open-minded approach to literary criticism, focusing on the infinite linguistic possibilities of poetry.

Jeong's poems are known for their rich imagery and use of language, particularly in regards to their descriptions of nature, their linguistic creativity, and their use of poetic devices. Jeong's poetry typically explores the linguistic details of the Korean language, such as in her collection Subject Markers, Topic Markers (2014), whose title refers to the main four nominative case markers in Korean.

Works

Works in Korean

Poetry collections
 My Life, a Birch Tree (1996)
 White Book (2000)
 180 Thousand Years and the Color Peach (2005)
 Bursting (2008)
 Subject Markers, Topic Markers (2014)

Research and critical essays
 The Poetics of Parody (1997)
 The Language of Poetry Has a Thousand Tongues (1999)
 The Poetics of Pi (2010)

Works in translation
 Selected poems in A Galaxy Of Whale Poems: Poems by 50 Korean Poets
 "Trees Standing at the Edge"

Further reading
 "Jeong Kkeutbyeol Refutes Hong Jeongseon, Claims She Was Quoted Out of Context" (June 1998). 「정끝별씨, 홍정선씨 글 반박-자의적 글 인용 왜곡 불러」, 『한겨레』, 1998.6.13.
 "Mornings with Poetry: From Jeong Kkeutbyeol's 'Love'"  (August 2000). 「[시가 있는 아침] 정끝별 「사랑」 중」, 『중앙일보』, 2000.8.12.
 "Mornings with Poetry: Jeong Kkeutbyeol's 'Fret and Fume'" (August 2001). 「[시가 있는 아침] 정끝별 「안달복달」」, 『중앙일보』, 2001.8.10.

References

External links
 Jeong Kkeutbyeol's Contributions to Naver Cast.
 PEN America Online Translation Slam: Trees Standing at the Edge.
 Interview with Jeong Kkeutbyeol.

1964 births
20th-century South Korean poets
South Korean literary critics
21st-century South Korean poets
South Korean women poets
Living people
21st-century South Korean women writers
20th-century South Korean women writers
Ewha Womans University alumni